Dr. Al-Hassan Conteh is a Liberian academic and was the President of the University of Liberia. Conteh earned his doctorate at the University of Pennsylvania in 1993.

Faculty experience
Prof. Conteh has previously been a member of the African Studies Center of the University of Pennsylvania and the Geography and Urban Studies Department at Temple University. Conteh was also a Research Fellow at the Solomon Asch Center for Study of Ethno-political Conflict at Pennsylvania from 2001 to 2005. He served as the University of Liberia's 12th president from 1 December 2004, until 2008 and was succeeded by Dr. Emmett Dennis. Conteh is now Liberia's Ambassador Extraordinary and Plenipotentiary to the Federal Republic of Nigeria and the Economic Community of West African States (ECOWAS). ECOWASAll Africa

Sources

 Biography at unpenn.edu

Year of birth missing (living people)
Living people
University of Pennsylvania alumni
University of Pennsylvania faculty
University of Liberia alumni
Presidents of the University of Liberia
Ambassadors of Liberia to Nigeria